Don't Fight It is the debut album by Canadian rock band Red Rider, released in 1979 in Canada. Don't Fight It sold more than 100,000 copies in Canada and earned Cochrane and Red Rider their first gold album certification award and was later certified platinum. A United States version with a modified track list, dropping "Talkin' to Myself" and reordering the other tracks, was released in 1980.

The album was re-issued on CD July 29, 1994. The CD release restored the track "Talkin' to Myself" which was dropped on the initial vinyl release in the United States. Another newly remastered version was released in the UK in 2010 by Lemon Records.

The album reached number 146 on Billboard's Pop Albums chart while "White Hot" reached number 20 on the Canadian charts and number 48 on the Pop Singles chart in 1980 and "Don't Fight It" reached number 75.

The song "White Hot" is about poet Arthur Rimbaud and his travels through Africa. It also has a cult following on YouTube.

Track listing

Personnel
 Tom Cochrane - guitars, lead vocals (1-4, 6, 8, 10)
 Ken Greer - guitars
 Peter Boynton - keyboards, lead vocals (5, 7, 9)
 Jeff Jones - bass
 Rob Baker - drums

References

Red Rider albums
1979 debut albums
Capitol Records albums